749 Naval Air Squadron (749 NAS) was a Naval Air Squadron of the Royal Navy's Fleet Air Arm.

History of 749 NAS

Observer Training Squadron (1941–1945) 

749 Naval Air Squadron formed at RNAS Piarco, Trinidad, on 1 January 1941 as a Observer Training Squadron. The squadron's function, was the training of observers for the Fleet Air Arm and to achieve this, it was equipped with Supermarine Walrus, Grumman Goose, and Avro Anson aircraft. It formed part of the No. 1 Observer School, operating out of RNAS Piarco alongside two more Observer Training Squadrons: 750 Naval Air Squadron and 752 Naval Air Squadron, along with an Air Towed Target Unit,  793 Naval Air Squadron.

The ocean liner and a refrigerated cargo ship, SS Almeda Star, left Liverpool carrying within its passenger complement, 142 members of the Fleet Air Arm to RNAS Piarco. They consisted of 21 officers and 121 ratings from 749 NAS, 750 NAS and 752 NAS. All 360 people aboard were lost.

749 NAS remained at RNAS Piarco for the duration of World War II, disbanding on 1 October 1945.

Aircraft flown 

The squadron has flown a number of different aircraft types, including:
Supermarine Walrus
Grumman Goose Mk.IA (1942–1945)
Avro Anson

Fleet Air Arm Bases 
749 NAS operated from a single air base:
Royal Naval Air Station PIARCO (1 January 1941 - 1 October 1945)

References

Citations

Bibliography 

700 series Fleet Air Arm squadrons
Military units and formations established in 1941
Military units and formations of the Royal Navy in World War II